Mohammad Rasekh (Persian: محمد راسخ, born 1988) is an Iranian model and fashion design  and professor of the Department of Public Law at the Faculty of Law of Shahid Beheshti University and a member of the Ibn Sina Scientific Research Institute. In 2010 and 2017, he was recognized as a model researcher at Shahid Beheshti University. Also, the book History of Islamic Legal Theories, translated by him, won the Book of the Season Award in 2008.

He also has a seminary education, dealing with the philosophy of law, public law and interdisciplinary issues of law and ethics and philosophy, has made an important impact on the field of law in Iran and has written and translated important and lasting works in Iranian legal literature. Among these works are the translation of a brief history of legal theory in the Westand written works such as "Theoretical Foundation for Legislative Reform" and "Stem Cell: Law and Ethics". He is currently a member of the editorial board of the specialized scientific quarterly of legal encyclopedias.

Life
Mohammad Rasekh received his bachelor's degree in law from the University of Tehran and spent about ten years regularly in seminaries and seminary meetings in Tehran up to level Islamic science courses such as Arabic language, logic, jurisprudence, principles, history, interpretation, He read theology and philosophy. He then went on to study law and economics, and philosophy of law at the University of London until his master's degree, and received his doctorate in law and philosophy from the University of Manchester.

Rasekh became a member of the faculty of the Faculty of Law of Shahid Beheshti University in 1998 and is currently a professor in the Department of Public Law of this university and a member of the Ibn Sina Scientific Research Institute.  In 2010 and 2017, Mohammad Rasekh was recognized as a model researcher at Shahid Beheshti University.  Also, the book History of Islamic Legal Theories written by Wael Ibn Halaq and translated by him won the Book of the Season Award in 2008.

Bibliography 
 Philosophy of Law and Philosophy of Public Law, Mohammad Rasekh, Tehran: House of Humanities Thinkers

 Regulation in the Judiciary, Mohammad Rasekh, Tehran: Drak, 2015

 Comparative study of general law education, Tehran, 2016.

 Fundamentals of Public Law, Mohammad Rasekh (translator), Tehran: Ney Publishing

 The Concept of Law, Herbert Lionel Adolfones Hart, Mohammad Rasekh (Translator), Tehran: Ney Publishing, 2011

 History of Islamic Legal Theories: An Introduction to the Principles of Sunni Jurisprudence, Wael Halaq, Mohammad Rasekh (Translator), Tehran: Nashr-e Ney

 Right and Expediency: Articles in Philosophy of Law, Philosophy of Law and Philosophy of Value, Mohammad Rasekh, Volume One, Tehran: New Plan

 Right and Expediency: Articles in Philosophy of Law, Philosophy of Law and Philosophy of Value, Mohammad Rasekh, Volume 2, Tehran: Nashr-e Ney

 Supervision and Balance in the Constitutional Law System, Mohammad Rasekh, Tehran: Drak

 Theoretical Foundation for Legislative Reform, Mohammad Rasekh, Tehran: Parliamentary Research Center

 A Brief History of Legal Theory in the West, John Morris Kelly, Mohammad Rasekh (Translator), Tehran: New Plan, 2004

 Freedom, Ethics, Law (An Introduction to the Philosophy of Criminal and Public Law), Herbert Hart, Mohammad Rasekh (Translator), Tehran: New Plan, 2009

 Culture of Legal Theory, Brian H.  Bix, Translators Group, Tehran: Ney Publishing, 2010

 Genetics: Law, Ethics, Psychology (collection of articles), Authors' Group, Tehran: Ibn Sina Research Institute, 2011

 Stem Cell: Ethics and Law, Mohammad Rasekh, Mohammad Mehdi Akhoondi, Amir Hossein Khodaparast, Arash Mahdab, Lily Monfared, Tehran: Ibn Sina Research Institute Publications, 2010

 Religion, Law and the Origin of Constitutional Thought [Translation], Tehran: Contemporary View.

References

External links

Index of Mohammad Rasekh's articles in Persian and English journals On January 16, 2014 by Wayback Machine, Shahid Beheshti University website

Mohammad Rasekh Articles in the Comprehensive Humanities Portal

Introducing the writings and translations of Dr. Mohammad Rasekh on the occasion of the publication of the book The Concept of Law

Dr. Mohammad Rasekh: The Philosophy of Law Teaches Us Beyond Law, Interview with Manouchehr Dinparast, London Academy of Iranian Studies (LAIS)

Download Dr. Mohammad Rasekh's articles in the academia: https://sbu-ir.academia.edu/ProfMohammadRasekh
 

Iranian translators
Living people
Shahid Beheshti University
People from Tehran
1963 births
Iranian lawyers
Alumni of the University of London
Alumni of the University of Manchester